Maja Kambič (born 7 February 1988) is a former Slovenian female tennis player.

Kambič won two doubles titles on the ITF tour in her career. On 3 December 2007, she reached her best singles ranking of world number 939. On 10 September 2007, she peaked at world number 550 in the doubles rankings.

She made her WTA main draw debut at the 2008 Banka Koper Slovenia Open in the doubles event partnering Astrid Besser.

Kambič retired from tennis 2009.

ITF finals (2–2)

Doubles (2–2)

References 
 
 

1988 births
Living people
Slovenian female tennis players